Eucalyptus gongylocarpa, commonly known as baarla, marble gum or desert gum, is a species of tree endemic to central Australia. It has smooth bark, lance-shaped to elliptical leaves arranged more or less in opposite pairs, flower buds in groups of seven, whitish flowers and more or less spherical fruit.

Description
Flowering occurs from January to February and the flowers are whitish.

Taxonomy and naming
Eucalyptus gongylocarpa was first formally described in 1936 by William Blakely in Transactions and Proceedings of the Royal Society of South Australia from a specimen collected by Richard Helms in 1891. The specific epithet gongylocarpa is "from the Greek gongylos meaning 'round' and carpos meaning 'fruit', referring to its distinctively spherical fruits".

Distribution and habitat
Baarla is found on sand plains, sand dunes and rises in arid areas of Western Australia, South Australia and the Northern Territory where it is often the dominant tree in woodland and mallee. In Western Australia it occurs to the east of Sandstone and in South Australia it is common in the Great Victoria Desert. It occurs south from Lake Amadeus in the Northern Territory but is absent from the ranges and sandy plains in the north-west of South Australia.

See also
List of Eucalyptus species

References

Eucalypts of Western Australia
Trees of Australia
gongylocarpa
Myrtales of Australia
Plants described in 1936
Flora of South Australia
Flora of the Northern Territory
Taxa named by William Blakely